MS Nieuw Amsterdam is a  sailing for Holland America Line. The 81st ship to enter Holland America's fleet, she is the fourth ship to bear the name Nieuw Amsterdam in the line’s history.

Service history
Nieuw Amsterdam was laid down on 15 July 2008, launched on 30 October 2009 and completed on 30 June 2010.

The ship was christened by Princess Maxima of the Netherlands in Venice, Italy on 4 July 2010 before embarking on its maiden voyage from Venice on 5 July 2010.

On 10 October 2017, Nieuw Amsterdam was driven ashore at Santa Cruz Huatulco, Mexico. Strong winds blew her from her mooring, snapping her lines. She was freed and returned to her berth, but required an extra night of examination for hull damage. She was cleared to sail safely the next day.

On 4 May 2019, Nieuw Amsterdam was struck by fleet-mate  while docking stern-to-stern in Vancouver, British Columbia. No injuries were reported, and disembarkation on both ships proceeded as usual.

On 15 May 2020, Nieuw Amsterdam aided a sailing vessel in distress in waters off of Cape Town, South Africa. The vessel had lost its mast and was in need of fuel, and Nieuw Amsterdam was directed to its aid by the Cape Town Maritime Rescue Coordination Centre. Following a successful rendezvous, she continued on to Jakarta, Indonesia on a crew repatriation effort due to the COVID-19 pandemic.

Mechanics
Nieuw Amsterdam has dynamic positioning abilities, and is powered by six diesel generators and propelled by Azipod propulsion technology .

References

External links
Official website

Ships of the Holland America Line
Ships built in Venice
Panamax cruise ships
Ships built by Fincantieri
2009 ships